Comodo IceDragon was a Firefox-based open source web browser from the Comodo Group for Microsoft Windows.

Features
 Firefox-based: IceDragon 61 is based on the Firefox 61 codebase. It provides detection for Firefox hard-coded plugin installations.
 SiteInspector: Comodo's SiteInspector malware detection system is integrated into IceDragon. SiteInspector's link scanning feature allows one to check whether a web page is malicious before they visit that page.
 SecureDNS service: IceDragon offers Comodo's Secure DNS Service to users as an alternative to using their Internet Service Provider. This is intended to produce faster page loads and safer browsing because SecureDNS references a real-time block list (RBL) of malicious websites.

See also
 Comodo Cybersecurity
 Comodo Dragon – based on Chromium/Google's Chrome, also from Comodo Group
 Comodo Internet Security
 Comodo System Utilities
 Comodo Mobile Security

References

External links
 
 Softpedia.com, 3 January 2013

Icedragon
Portable software
Web browsers based on Firefox
Windows web browsers
Discontinued web browsers